The Canton of Vierzon-2 is a canton situated in the Cher département and in the Centre-Val de Loire region of France.

Geography
A farming and light industrial area in the Cher river valley, forming the northern part of the arrondissement of Vierzon.

Composition
At the French canton reorganisation which came into effect in March 2015, the borders of the canton were changed. It consists of the following 10 communes:
Dampierre-en-Graçay
Genouilly
Graçay
Méry-sur-Cher
Nohant-en-Graçay
Saint-Georges-sur-la-Prée
Saint-Hilaire-de-Court
Saint-Outrille
Thénioux
Vierzon (partly)

See also
 Arrondissements of the Cher department
 Cantons of the Cher department
 Communes of the Cher department

References

Vierzon 2nd Canton